Salut d'Amour may refer to: 
 Salut d'amor, an Occitan lyric genre
 Salut d'Amour, a musical piece by the English composer Edward Elgar
 Salut d'Amour (TV series), a South Korean television series broadcast in 1994–5 
 Salut d'Amour (film), a 2015 South Korean film